Chinatown is an ethnic enclave in the City of Westminster, London, bordering Soho to its north and west, Theatreland to the south and east. The enclave currently occupies the area in and around Gerrard Street. It contains a number of Chinese restaurants, bakeries, supermarkets, souvenir shops, and other Chinese-run businesses. The first Chinatown was located in Limehouse in the East End.

History
The first area in London known as Chinatown was located in the Limehouse area of the East End of London. At the start of the 20th century, the Chinese population of London was concentrated in that area, setting up businesses which catered to the Chinese sailors who frequented in Docklands. The area was known through exaggerated reports and tales of slum housing and (the then-legal) opium dens, rather than the Chinese restaurants and supermarkets of the current Chinatown. However, much of the area was damaged by aerial bombing during the Blitz in the Second World War, although a number of elderly Chinese still choose to live in this area. After the Second World War, however, the growing popularity of Chinese cuisine and an influx of immigrants from Hong Kong led to an increasing number of Chinese restaurants being opened elsewhere.

The present Chinatown, which is off Shaftesbury Avenue did not start to be established until the 1970s. Previously, it was a regular Soho area, run-down, with Gerrard Street the main thoroughfare. It was dominated by the Post Office, facing Macclesfield Street, and other major establishments were The Tailor & Cutter House, at 43/44, now a Chinese supermarket and restaurant, the Boulogne Restaurant, near the Wardour Street end, and by Peter Mario's Restaurant at the other end. Other businesses included a master baker's, the Sari Centre, Lesgrain French Coffee House, Harrison Marks' Glamour Studio, an Indian restaurant and various brothels. Probably the first Chinese restaurants opened in Lisle Street, parallel to Gerrard Street, and more opened gradually; one of the first restaurants was Kowloon Restaurant. The Tailor & Cutter did not close down until around 1974. The area now has more than 80 restaurants.

In 2005, the property developer Rosewheel proposed a plan to redevelop the eastern part of Chinatown. The plan was opposed by many of the existing retailers in Chinatown, as they believe that the redevelopment would drive out the traditional Chinese retail stores from the area and change the ethnic characteristic of Chinatown. In October 2013 and July 2018, the London Chinatown Community Centre (LCCC) organised a one-day shutdown in protest of violent tactics by immigration officers from the Home Office.

The London Chinatown Community Centre (LCCC) has been housed in the Chinatown area since it was founded in 1980 by Dr Abraham Lue. The Centre claims to have received 40,000 people for help and assistance since its foundation. Located since 1998 on the second floor of 28-29 Gerrard Street, the Centre relocated to 2 Leicester Court in 2012, above the Hippodrome Casino.

On 25 July 2016, a new Chinatown gate on Wardour Street was opened by Prince Andrew, the Duke of York. It was made by Chinese artisans and assembled in London. The gate is in the style of the Qing dynasty.

There was a Chinese-style pavilion at Newport Place from the 1980s which was a popular meeting point, but it was demolished in 2016 after more than thirty years, despite protests. The development authorities had plans to renovate and enlarge the square. The construction of a new pavilion at a different location was announced.

Geography
Chinatown has no officially defined size, but it has commonly been considered to approximately encompass Gerrard Street, the bottom half of Wardour Street, Rupert Street and Rupert Court, a section of Shaftesbury Avenue and Lisle Street, Macclesfield Street and Newport Place, Newport Court and Little Newport Street.

 Charing Cross Road – built 1887, and named as it led to the cross at Charing, from the Old English word "cierring", referring to a bend in the River Thames
 Coventry Street – after Henry Coventry, Secretary of State to Charles II, who lived near here in Shaver's Hall
 Cranbourn Street – built in the 1670s and named after local landowner the Earl of Salisbury, Viscount Cranbourn (or Cranbourne) after the town in Dorset
 Dansey Place – unknown; formerly named George Yard, after a pub adjacent called the George and Dragon
 Gerrard Place and Gerrard Street – after Charles Gerard, 1st Earl of Macclesfield, who owned this land when the street as built in the 1680s; the form ‘Gerrard’ developed in the 19th century
 Great Windmill Street – after a windmill that formerly stood near here in Ham Yard in the 16th-17th century; the ‘great’ prefix was to distinguish it from Little Windmill Street, now Lexington Street
 Horse and Dolphin Yard – after the Horse and Dolphin inn which stood here in the 17th – 19th centuries
 Leicester Court, Leicester Place, Leicester Square and Leicester Street – in the 17th and 18th centuries on the north side of the square was Leicester House, built by Robert Sidney, 2nd Earl of Leicester and later the residence of Frederick, Prince of Wales; Leicester Court was formerly Ryder Court, after a local leaseholder, Richard Ryder, but was renamed in 1936
 Lisle Street – after Philip, Viscount Lisle, who succeeded to the earldom of Leicester in 1677
 Macclesfield Street – after Charles Gerard, 1st Earl of Macclesfield, local landowner in the 17th century
 Newport Court, Newport Place and Little Newport Street – after Mountjoy Blount, Earl of Newport (Isle of Wight), who owned a house on this street (then just Newport Street) in the 17th century. Following the construction of Charing Cross Road, Newport Street was split in two and the two sections renamed as they are today
 Rupert Court and Rupert Street – after Prince Rupert of the Rhine, noted 17th century general and son of Elizabeth Stuart, daughter of King James I; he was First Lord of the Admiralty when this street was built in 1676
 Shaftesbury Avenue – after Anthony Ashley Cooper, 7th Earl of Shaftesbury, Victorian politician and philanthropist
 Wardour Street – named after local 17th century landowners the Wardour family, and formerly called Colman Hedge Lane/Close after a nearby field; the section south of Brewer Street was formerly Prince Street prior to 1878, in parallel with Rupert Street

Education

The City of Westminster operates the Charing Cross Library with the Westminster Chinese Library.

Transport
The nearest London Underground stations are Leicester Square and Piccadilly Circus.

Popular culture

The song lyrics to Warren Zevon's 1978 hit song "Werewolves of London": "He was looking for the place called Lee Ho Fook‘s / Gonna get a big dish of beef chow mein" refer to Lee Ho Fook, a Chinese restaurant that stood on 15 Gerrard Street.

The films Ping Pong (1986) and Soursweet (1988) are set in Chinatown; they are regarded as the first British-Chinese films, and make extensive use of Chinatown locations.

Car park
There is a China Town car park, which is underneath Vale Royal House, a large residential block in Newport Court, both built in the 1980s and managed by Westminster City Council.

Gallery

See also

 Brick Lane
 Chinese community in London
 British Chinese
 Wong Kei

References
Notes

Further reading

 "London's first Chinatown". portcities.org.uk. Accessed 11 April 2011.

External links

The official Chinatown London website
 London Chinatown Community Centre (LCCC) 
 New Google 360 degree tour of Chinatown
 The official London Chinatown Chinese Association website
 Reassessing what we collect website – Chinese London - history of Chinese London with objects and images
 Chinatown Chinese Lion Dance

 

 
Areas of London
Districts of the City of Westminster
Chinese community in the United Kingdom
London
Chinatown, London
Soho, London
City of Westminster